The 1999 CA-TennisTrophy was a men's tennis tournament played on indoor carpet courts at the Wiener Stadthalle in Vienna, Austria and was part of the Championship Series of the 1999 ATP Tour. It was the 25th edition of the tournament and was held from 11 October until 18 October 1999. Fifth-seeded Greg Rusedski won the singles title.

Finals

Singles

 Greg Rusedski defeated  Nicolas Kiefer 6–7(5–7), 2–6, 6–3, 7–5, 6–4
 It was Rusedski's 3rd title of the year and the 12th of his career.

Doubles

 David Prinosil /  Sandon Stolle defeated  Piet Norval /  Kevin Ullyett 6–3, 6–4
 It was Prinosil's only title of the year and the 8th of his career. It was Stolle's 4th title of the year and the 13th of his career.

References

External links
 Official website
 ATP tournament profile
 ITF tournament edition details

 
CA-TennisTrophy
Vienna Open